Aimee Fisher (born 24 January 1995) is a New Zealand sprint canoeist.

Fisher was born in Rotorua. She represented New Zealand at the 2016 Summer Olympics, where she competed alongside Jaimee Lovett, Caitlin Ryan and Kayla Imrie in the women's K-4 500 metres event. After having trained together for just 18 months, the young crew achieved a fifth place in the medal race.

References

External links

1995 births
Living people
Olympic canoeists of New Zealand
Canoeists at the 2016 Summer Olympics
New Zealand female canoeists
Sportspeople from Rotorua
ICF Canoe Sprint World Championships medalists in kayak